Tommaso Baldasso (born 29 January 1998) is an Italian basketball player for Olimpia Milano of the Italian Lega Basket Serie A (LBA) and the EuroLeague. He mainly plays at the point guard position.

National team career
Baldasso was selected for the senior national team to play in EuroBasket 2022 qualification. He made his debut on 30 November 2020 in the match won by 70 to 66 against Russia.

References

External links
Lega Basket Serie A profile  Retrieved 30 November 2020
LNP profile  Retrieved 30 November 2020

1998 births
Living people
Fortitudo Pallacanestro Bologna players
Italian men's basketball players
Lega Basket Serie A players
Olimpia Milano players
Pallacanestro Virtus Roma players
Shooting guards
Sportspeople from Turin